South Haven Christian School is a private, K–12 Christian school located in Springfield, Tennessee. It is a ministry of South Haven Baptist Church and is of Independent Baptist affiliation. South Haven enrolls approximately 300 students.

The school is accredited by the Tennessee Association of Christian Schools (TACS) and approved by the Tennessee Department of Education.

Athletics
South Haven Christian School's Patriots boys athletic teams compete in the Middle Tennessee Christian Athletic Association. The Varsity football team were the MTAC champions of 2017. They faced their rivals CCS with an ending score of 61–58. the Varsity girls basketball team won 2nd place in the state tournament of 2019
The Varsity boys won the soccer state tournament  in 2019 with an ending score of 3–2.

External links
Official website

Christian schools in Tennessee
Tennessee Association of Christian Schools
Private K-12 schools in Tennessee
Schools in Robertson County, Tennessee